Scott Alan Stenzel (born July 28, 1980) is an American professional stock car racing driver. He raced in the FASCAR league as a teenager and later raced in the ARCA Re/Max Series, before making his NASCAR debut in 2010. He last competed part-time in the NASCAR Gander Outdoors Truck Series, driving the No. 63 Chevrolet Silverado for Copp Motorsports and the No. 34 Silverado for Reaume Brothers Racing.

Early life
Stenzel was born on July 28, 1980 in Mankato, Minnesota and lived in Wells, Minnesota for the first eight years of his life, before moving to Alexandria, Minnesota when his father transferred positions within the United States Postal Service.  Stenzel lived next to a home made race track owned by Ron Fischer and became friends with Ron's son Josh. They raced together in karts, 4wheelers, stock cars and dirt bikes.

Stenzel entered the FASCAR racing series at the age of 16.  He raced enduro super stocks at weekends at local speedways.  These races were 250 laps long and lasted all Sunday afternoon.  He raced at I-94 Speedway in Sauk Center, Minnesota and Fergus Falls Speedway in Fergus Falls, Minnesota.  These two tracks were 5/8 mile long and allowed Stenzel to gain 'seat time'.

In 1999 Stenzel sold his racing gear to attend college at North Dakota State University and then transferred to Full Sail Real World Education in Orlando, Florida.  After graduation Stenzel opened up a production company in 2003 called Digi Craft.  His clients included Universal Orlando Resort, Disney Adventures Magazine, Indianapolis Motor Speedway, National Retail Federation and others.

ARCA Racing Series
Stenzel met Charlie Patterson, owner of Nex-Gen Motorsports and retired owner of Patterson Drive Shafts, at the 2006 Daytona 500.  Patterson worked with Stenzel to take his career to the professional level.  “My main goal is to find as many young, intelligent drivers, who can get the job done. I believe that Scott has what it takes to make it big in Motorsports. When I look at Scott I see the next Jimmie Johnson, he really is a sponsor’s dream.  He really impresses me to see him do such a great job behind the wheel,” Patterson stated.

On December 11–12, 2007 Stenzel attended Finish Line Racing School headed up by Mike Loescher.  He graduated the class with flying colors and Loesher approved him ready for ARCA RE/MAX contention.

On December 3, 2007 it was announced that Stenzel would test the No. 75 Bob Schacht Motorsports Chevrolet Monte Carlo in the ARCA Re/Max Series at the Daytona International Speedway on December 14–16, 2007. There was a record number of drivers who showed up to this test. Posting a total of 40 laps he was granted permission to participate in all of the 2008 ARCA events and was given his official license.

Stenzel drove a Schacht-prepared car in the December 18–20, 2009 Daytona test for ARCA drivers and teams, and obtained his 2010 license for the entire season.

Stenzel signed up with the reality documentary television series called Yellow Stripes: Making the Driver. He finished filming for the first episodes July 6, 2009, a co-production between Gen2Media and Digi Craft. When Yellow Stripes: Making the Driver agreed to sponsor his car, Scott approached Spraker Racing to finalize the Daytona arrangements. Jeff and his crew prepared Scott’s speedway car, which was purchased from the Wood Brothers and powered by a Roush/Yates motor. On January 22, 2010, Stenzel entered his No. 42 Ford Fusion into the Lucas Oil 200 at Daytona with Jeff Spraker agreeing to sit atop the war wagon as crew chief throughout speed week.

When asked about preparing for the upcoming event, Stenzel commented, “I can’t thank everyone enough for helping out a rookie driver. Jeff Spraker, and his skilled crew, have taken me and this Wood Brothers Ford Fusion on at the last minute. Everything is coming together smoothly with everyone pulling extra duty. Plus, as a team we’ve been able to gel. Spraker’s been to Daytona several times. He knows what it takes to lead and finish up front, but he’s yet to win one. Now, we share the same goal – to win at Daytona.”

On April 23, 2010, Spraker agreed to field the car for Stenzel. Stenzel qualified 28th at Talladega Superspeedway. After 250 miles were completed in the race, he finished in the 7th-place position. He received the CGS Hard Charger award for passing the most cars during the race.

On January 11–12, 2011 Stenzel partnered up with Spraker Racing again to revisit Daytona International Speedway.

NASCAR
On September 17, 2010 Stenzel made his NASCAR debut by driving the No. 37 Spraker Racing Chevrolet and qualifying into the NASCAR K&N Pro Series East's New Hampshire 125. He started the race in 26th place and finished 21st place.

In 2012, Stenzel made his NASCAR Camping World Truck Series debut at Kansas Speedway, where he finished 23rd.

In 2019, he returned to the Truck Series for the SpeedyCash.com 400 at Texas, driving the No. 34 for Reaume Brothers Racing.

Personal life
Stenzel currently resides in Orlando, Florida with his wife Bree.

Motorsports career results

NASCAR
(key) (Bold – Pole position awarded by qualifying time. Italics – Pole position earned by points standings or practice time. * – Most laps led.)

Gander Outdoors Truck Series

K&N Pro Series East

ARCA Racing Series
(key) (Bold – Pole position awarded by qualifying time. Italics – Pole position earned by points standings or practice time. * – Most laps led.)

 Season still in progress
 Ineligible for series points

References

 http://arcaracing.com/news.php?contentid=10368

External links
 
 
 Official "Yellow Stripes Making the Driver" - Driver Development site

Living people
1980 births
Sportspeople from Mankato, Minnesota
Racing drivers from Minnesota
NASCAR drivers
ARCA Menards Series drivers
People from Wells, Minnesota
People from Alexandria, Minnesota
People from Orlando, Florida